DeNoon is a ghost town located  southwest of Superior in Pinal County, Arizona, United States. James DeNoon Reymert founded and named the town in 1889. The town grew quickly, and its own post office opened on March 19, 1890; however, the post office closed the following year, and the town disappeared soon afterwards.

References

External links
Ghosttowns.com-DeNoon, Arizona

Ghost towns in Arizona
Former populated places in Pinal County, Arizona